Vijay Chand is a Fiji Indian politician who won the Labasa Indian Communal Constituency for the Labour Party in 2006 general election.

Prior to entering politics he was an Information Officer with the Ministry of Information, Fiji.

In 2009, after the military administration of Frank Bainimarama dismissed all city and town councils, Chand was appointed the Administrator of the towns of Labasa and Savusavu on the island of Vanua Levu. He still holds these positions as of 2015.

References 

Fiji Labour Party politicians
Indian members of the House of Representatives (Fiji)
Fijian Hindus
Living people
Fijian civil servants
Politicians from Labasa
Year of birth missing (living people)